This is a list of buildings belonging to the University of Iceland.

 Aðalbygging (main building)
 Askja
 Árnagarður
 Eirberg
 Endurmenntun
 Gamli Garður
 Gimli
 Hagi
 Háskólatorg
 Íþróttafræðasetur
 Lögberg
 Læknagarður
 Oddi
 Tæknigarður
 VR I, II and III

University of Iceland buildings
Iceland
University of Iceland
University